Shot Through the Heart is a 1998 film.

Shot Through the Heart may also refer to:

 Shot Through the Heart (album), by Jennifer Warnes, 1979
 "Shot Through the Heart", a song by Bon Jovi, on their 1984 album Bon Jovi
 "Shot Thru the Heart", song by Twice, on their 2018 EP Summer Nights

See also 
 "Schott Through the Heart", an episode of the TV series Supergirl
Shot in the Heart, a memoir by Mikal Gilmore
 "You Give Love a Bad Name" by Bon Jovi, which has "Shot through the heart" as the first line of its chorus